This article contains lists of achievements in major senior-level international curling and wheelchair curling tournaments according to first-place, second-place and third-place results obtained by teams representing different nations. The objective is not to create combined medal tables; the focus is on listing the best positions achieved by teams in major international tournaments, ranking the nations according to the most number of podiums accomplished by teams of these nations.

Results 
For the making of these lists, results from following major international tournaments were consulted:

 IOC: International Olympic Committee
 IPC: International Paralympic Committee
 WCF: World Curling Federation

Medals earned by athletes from defunct National Olympic Committees (NOCs) and National Paralympic Committees (NPCs) or historical teams are NOT merged with the results achieved by their immediate successor states. The International Olympic Committee (IOC) and International Paralympic Committee (IPC) do NOT combine medals of these nations or teams.

The tables are pre-sorted by total number of first-place results, second-place results and third-place results, respectively. When equal ranks are given, nations are listed in alphabetical order.

Curling and wheelchair curling 

*Defunct National Olympic Committees (NOCs) and National Paralympic Committees (NPCs) or historical teams are shown in italic.
†Non International Olympic Committee (IOC) members.

Curling

Men, women and mixed 

*Defunct National Olympic Committees (NOCs) or historical teams are shown in italic.
†Non International Olympic Committee (IOC) members.

Men 

*Defunct National Olympic Committees (NOCs) or historical teams are shown in italic.
†Non International Olympic Committee (IOC) members.

Women 

*Defunct National Olympic Committees (NOCs) or historical teams are shown in italic.
†Non International Olympic Committee (IOC) members.

Mixed 

†Non International Olympic Committee (IOC) members.

Wheelchair curling 

†Non International Paralympic Committee (IPC) members.

See also 
 World Curling Rankings
 List of major achievements in sports by nation

Notes

References

General 
Official results
 Curling
 Olympic tournament: Medal records
 World Curling Championships: Medal records
 World Mixed Curling Championship: Medal records
 World Mixed Doubles Curling Championship: Medal records
 Wheelchair curling
 Paralympic tournament: Medal records
 World Wheelchair Curling Championship: Medal records

Specific

External links 
 World Curling Federation (WCF) – official website

Curling
Achievements